This is a list of 134 species in the genus Ceroplastes, wax scales.

Ceroplastes species

 Ceroplastes actiniformis Green, 1896 c g
 Ceroplastes agrestis Hempel, 1932 c g
 Ceroplastes ajmerensis (Avasthi & Shafee, 1979) c g
 Ceroplastes alamensis Avasthi & Shafee, 1986 c g
 Ceroplastes albolineatus  c g
 Ceroplastes amazonicus Hempel, 1900 c g
 Ceroplastes angulatus Cockerell, 1898 c g
 Ceroplastes argentinus Brethes, 1921 c g
 Ceroplastes avicenniae Newstead, 1917 c g
 Ceroplastes bergi Cockerell, 1901 c g
 Ceroplastes bernardensis Cockerell, 1902 c g
 Ceroplastes bicolor Hempel, 1901 c g
 Ceroplastes bipartitus Newstead, 1917 c g
 Ceroplastes boyacensis Mosquera, 1979 c g
 Ceroplastes brachystegiae Hodgson, 1969 c g
 Ceroplastes brachyurus Cockerell, 1903 c g
 Ceroplastes brevicauda Hall, 1931 c g
 Ceroplastes bruneri Cockerell & Cockerell in Cockerell, 1902 c g
 Ceroplastes caesalpiniae Reyne, 1964 c g
 Ceroplastes campinensis Hempel, 1901 c g
 Ceroplastes candela Cockerell & King in Cockerell, 1902 c g
 Ceroplastes cassiae (Chavannes, 1848) c g
 Ceroplastes castelbrancoi Almeida, 1973 c g
 Ceroplastes centroroseus Chen, 1974 c g
 Ceroplastes ceriferus (Fabricius, 1798) c
 Ceroplastes circumdatus Green, 1923 c g
 Ceroplastes cirripediformis Comstock, 1881 i c g b  (barnacle scale)
 Ceroplastes cistudiformis Cockerell, 1893 c g
 Ceroplastes coloratus Cockerell, 1898 c g
 Ceroplastes combreti Brain, 1920 c g
 Ceroplastes communis Hempel, 1900 c g
 Ceroplastes confluens Cockerell & Tinsley, 1898 c g
 Ceroplastes coniformis Newstead, 1913 c g
 Ceroplastes constricta (De Lotto, 1969) c g
 Ceroplastes cultus Hempel, 1900 c g
 Ceroplastes cundinamarcensis Mosquera, 1979 c g
 Ceroplastes cuneatus Hempel, 1900 c g
 Ceroplastes deceptrix (De Lotto, 1965) c g
 Ceroplastes deciduosus Morrison, 1919 c g
 Ceroplastes deodorensis Hempel, 1937 c g
 Ceroplastes depressus Cockerell, 1893 c g
 Ceroplastes destructor Newstead, 1917 c g
 Ceroplastes diospyros Hempel, 1928 c g
 Ceroplastes dugesii Lichtenstein, 1885 c g
 Ceroplastes elytropappi (Brain, 1920) c g
 Ceroplastes eucleae Brain, 1920 c g
 Ceroplastes eugeniae Hall, 1931 c g
 Ceroplastes excaecariae Hempel, 1912 c g
 Ceroplastes fairmairii Signoret, 1872 c g
 Ceroplastes ficus Newstead, 1910 c g
 Ceroplastes floridensis Comstock, 1881 c g
 Ceroplastes flosculoides Matile-Ferrero in Matile-Ferrero & Couturier, 1993 c g
 Ceroplastes formicarius Hempel, 1900 c g
 Ceroplastes formosus Hempel, 1900 c g
 Ceroplastes fumidus De Lotto, 1978 c g
 Ceroplastes galeatus Newstead, 1911 c g
 Ceroplastes giganteus Dozier, 1931 c g
 Ceroplastes gigas Cockerell, 1914 c g
 Ceroplastes grandis Hempel, 1900 c g
 Ceroplastes gregarius Hempel, 1932 c g
 Ceroplastes hawanus Williams & Watson, 1990 c g
 Ceroplastes helichrysi Hall, 1931 c g
 Ceroplastes hempeli Lizer y Trelles, 1919 c g
 Ceroplastes hodgsoni (Matile-Ferrero & Le Ruyet, 1985) c g
 Ceroplastes hololeucus De Lotto, 1969 c g
 Ceroplastes iheringi Cockerell, 1895 c g
 Ceroplastes immanis Green, 1935 c g
 Ceroplastes insulanus De Lotto, 1971 c g
 Ceroplastes irregularis Cockerell, 1893 c g
 Ceroplastes itatiayensis Hempel, 1938 c g
 Ceroplastes jamaicensis White, 1846 c g
 Ceroplastes janeirensis (Gray, 1828) c g
 Ceroplastes japonicus Green, 1921 c g
 Ceroplastes kunmingensis (Tang & Xie in Tang, 1991) c g
 Ceroplastes lahillei Cockerell, 1910 c g
 Ceroplastes lamborni Newstead, 1917 c g
 Ceroplastes leonardianus Lizer y Trelles, 1939 c g
 Ceroplastes lepagei Costa Lima, 1940 c g
 Ceroplastes longicauda  c g
 Ceroplastes longiseta Leonardi, 1911 c g
 Ceroplastes lucidus Hempel, 1900 c g
 Ceroplastes macgregori Sampedro & Butze, 1984 c g
 Ceroplastes magnicauda Reyne, 1964 c g
 Ceroplastes marmoreus Cockerell, 1903 c g
 Ceroplastes martinae Mosquera, 1979 c g
 Ceroplastes mierii (Targioni Tozzetti, 1866) c g
 Ceroplastes milleri Takahashi, 1939 c g
 Ceroplastes minutus Cockerell, 1898 c g
 Ceroplastes mosquerai Ben-Dov, 1993 c g
 Ceroplastes murrayi Froggatt, 1919 c g
 Ceroplastes myricae (Linnaeus, 1767) c g
 Ceroplastes nakaharai Gimpel in Gimpel, Miller & Davidson, 1974 c g
 Ceroplastes novaesi Hempel, 1900 c g
 Ceroplastes ocreus Mosquera, 1984 c g
 Ceroplastes parvus Green, 1935 c g
 Ceroplastes paucispinus De Lotto, 1970 c g
 Ceroplastes personatus Newstead, 1898 c g
 Ceroplastes pseudoceriferus Green, 1935 c g
 Ceroplastes psidii (Chavannes, 1848) c g
 Ceroplastes purpurellus Cockerell, 1903 c g
 Ceroplastes purpureus Hempel, 1900 c g
 Ceroplastes quadratus Green, 1935 c g
 Ceroplastes quadrilineatus Newstead, 1910 c g
 Ceroplastes rarus Hempel, 1900 c g
 Ceroplastes reunionensis Ben-Dov & Matile-Ferrero in: Ben-Dov et al., 2000 c g
 Ceroplastes rhizophorae Hempel, 1918 c g
 Ceroplastes rotundus Hempel, 1900 c g
 Ceroplastes royenae Hall, 1931 c g
 Ceroplastes rubens Maskell, 1839 i c g b  (red wax scale)
 Ceroplastes rufus De Lotto, 1966 c g
 Ceroplastes rusci (Linnaeus, 1758) c g b  (fig scale)
 Ceroplastes rusticus De Lotto, 1961 c g
 Ceroplastes sanguineus Cockerell, 1905 c g
 Ceroplastes schrottkyi Cockerell, 1905 c g
 Ceroplastes simplex Hempel, 1900 c g
 Ceroplastes sinensis Del Guercio, 1900 c g b  (Chinese wax scale)
 Ceroplastes singularis Newstead, 1910 c g
 Ceroplastes sinoiae Hall, 1931 c g
 Ceroplastes speciosus Hempel, 1900 c g
 Ceroplastes spicatus Hall, 1937 c g
 Ceroplastes stenocephalus De Lotto, 1961 c g
 Ceroplastes subrotundus Leonardi, 1911 c g
 Ceroplastes sumatrensis Reyne, 1965 c g
 Ceroplastes tachardiaformis Brain, 1920 c g
 Ceroplastes theobromae Newstead, 1908 c g
 Ceroplastes titschaki Lindinger, 1942 c g
 Ceroplastes toddafiae Hall g
 Ceroplastes toddaliae Hall, 1931 c g
 Ceroplastes trochezi Mosquera, 1979 c g
 Ceroplastes uapacae Hall, 1931 c g
 Ceroplastes utilis Cockerell, 1893 c g
 Ceroplastes variegatus Hempel, 1900 c g
 Ceroplastes vinsonioides Newstead, 1911 c g
 Ceroplastes xishuangensis Tang & Xie in Tang, 1991 c g

Data sources: i = ITIS, c = Catalogue of Life, g = GBIF, b = Bugguide.net

References

Ceroplastes
Articles created by Qbugbot